Cecidology may refer to:

 The study of plant galls (known in botany as )
 Cecidology, the journal of the British Plant Gall Society